Ctesias (fl. fifth century BC), also known as Ctesias of Cnidus, was a Greek physician and historian from the town of Cnidus in Caria, then part of the Achaemenid Empire.

Historical events

Ctesias, who lived in the fifth century BC, was physician to the Achaemenid king, Artaxerxes II, whom he accompanied in 401 BC on his expedition against his brother Cyrus the Younger. Ctesias was part of the entourage of King Artaxerxes at the Battle of Cunaxa (401 BC) against Cyrus the Younger and his Greek mercenaries called the Ten Thousand, when Ctesias provided medical assistance to the king by treating his flesh wound. He reportedly was involved in negotiations with the Greeks after the battle, and also helped their Spartan general Clearchus before his execution at the royal court at Babylon.

Ctesias was the author of treatises on rivers and on the Persian revenues as well as an account of India entitled Indica (Ἰνδικά), and of a history of Assyria and Persia in 23 books, entitled Persica (Περσικά) that was written in opposition to Herodotus in the Ionic dialect. Professedly, the work was founded on the Persian Royal Archives.

Persica 

The first six books of Persica covered the history of Assyria and Babylon to the foundation of the Persian empire in 550 BC by Cyrus the Great; the remaining 17 books covered the years to 398 BC. Of the two histories, abridgments by Photius and fragments are preserved by Athenaeus, Plutarch, Nicolaus of Damascus, and especially Diodorus Siculus, whose second book is derived mainly from Ctesias. As to the worth of Persica, much controversy occurred, both in ancient and modern times. Although many ancient authorities valued the work highly and used it to discredit Herodotus, a modern author writes, "(Ctesias's) unreliability makes Herodotus seem a model of accuracy." Reportedly, Ctesias's account of the Assyrian kings does not reconcile with the cuneiform evidence. The satirist Lucian thought so little of the historical reliability of Ctesias that in his satirical True Story he places Ctesias on an island where the evil were punished. Lucian wrote, "The people who suffered the greatest torment were those who had told lies when they were alive and written mendacious histories; among them were Ctesias of Cnidus, Herodotus, and many others."

According to the Encyclopædia Britannica, Ctesias mentioned that the grave of Darius I at Persepolis was in a cliff face that could be reached with an apparatus of ropes.

Indica 

A record of the view that the Persians held of India was written by Ctesias under the title Indica. It includes descriptions of artisans, philosophers, and people having the qualities of deities, as well as accounts of unquantifiable gold, among other riches and wonders. The work is of value as it records the beliefs of the Persians about India. The book only remains in fragments and in reports made about the book by later authors.

References

Further reading
 Ed., trad. et commentaire par Dominique Lenfant, Ctésias de Cnide. La Perse. L'Inde. Autres fragments, Collection Budé, Belles Lettres, Paris, 2004.
 
 Jan P. Stronk: Ctesias' Persian History. Part I: Introduction, Text, and Translation, Wellem Verlag, Düsseldorf, 2010.
 Andrew G. Nichols, Ctesias: On India. Translation and Commentary, Duckworth, 2011, 
 Lloyd Llewellyn-Jones and James Robson, Ctesias' History of Persia: Tales of the Orient, Oxford, 2010.

External links
Ctesias of Cnidus
Overview of all fragments of the Persica and Indica by Jona Lendering
Photius' Excerpt of Ctesias' Persica translated by J. H. Freese (1920)
Photius' Excerpt of Ctesias' Indica translated by J.H. Freese (1920)
Greek text (Müller 1858)
Texts of Ctesias

Classical-era Greek historians
4th-century BC historians
5th-century BC Greek physicians
Ancient Cnidians
Ancient Greeks from the Achaemenid Empire
5th-century BC births
4th-century BC deaths
Historians from ancient Anatolia
Physicians of the Achaemenid Empire
Historians of Iran
Year of birth unknown
Year of death unknown
Greek Indologists
Historians from the Achaemenid Empire
People from Muğla Province